Itzler is a surname. Notable people with the surname include:

 Jason Itzler (born 1967), American businessman, pimp, and convicted criminal
 Jesse Itzler (born 1971), also known by the stage name Jesse Jaymes, American musician, rapper, producer, and entrepreneur

See also
 Itzer